Sandy Madeleine Baltimore (born 19 February 2000) is a French professional footballer who plays as a forward for Division 1 Féminine club Paris Saint-Germain and the France national team.

Early life
Baltimore began playing football at the age of 10. She is of Guadeloupean origin.

Club career
A youth academy graduate of Paris Saint-Germain, Baltimore made her senior team debut on 9 October 2016, replacing Hawa Cissoko in a 3–0 league win against Metz. In April 2018, she scored a brace in her team's 4–0 win against Marseille. It was just Baltimore's eighth league match, and her fourth start, for PSG during the 2017–18 season. She signed her first professional contract with PSG at the end of the season, after helping the club win the 2017–18 Coupe de France.

After scoring eight goals and providing ten assists during the 2020–21 season, Baltimore was named the Division 1 Féminine's top prospect by UNFP.

International career
Baltimore is a former French youth international and was part of the France under-19 squad which won 2019 UEFA Championship. She scored a goal in the final against Germany to help her team win their fifth title in tournament's history.

On 1 December 2020, Baltimore made her senior team debut in a 12–0 win against Kazakhstan. She replaced Amel Majri at the 46th minute of the game and went on to score a goal.

Career statistics

Club

International

Scores and results list France's goal tally first, score column indicates score after each Baltimore goal.

Honours

Club
Paris Saint-Germain
 Division 1 Féminine: 2020–21
 Coupe de France féminine: 2017–18, 2021–22
 UEFA Women's Champions League runner-up: 2016–17

International
France U19
 UEFA Women's Under-19 Championship: 2019

Individual
 UEFA Women's Under-19 Championship Team of the Tournament: 2019
 Trophées UNFP du football Young Player of the Year: 2020–21
 Trophées UNFP du football Team of the Year: 2020–21
 Trophées FFF D1 Féminine - Young Player of the Year: 2020–21
 Trophées FFF D1 Féminine - Team of the Year: 2020–21

References

External links
 
 
 PSG profile at en.psg.fr
 
 

2000 births
Living people
Sportspeople from Colombes
Footballers from Hauts-de-Seine
Women's association football forwards
French women's footballers
France women's youth international footballers
France women's international footballers
Paris Saint-Germain Féminine players
Division 1 Féminine players
Black French sportspeople
French people of Guadeloupean descent
UEFA Women's Euro 2022 players